Alicia Rodríguez (born 21 May 1992) is a Chilean actress. She is best known for her performance as Daniela Ramírez in Young and Wild.

Selected filmography

Awards 
  2012  Huelva Ibero-American Film Festival || Colón de Plata: Best Actress  for Young and Wild

References

External links
 

1992 births
Living people
Actresses from Santiago
Chilean film actresses